Naroma is a genus of moths in the subfamily Lymantriinae. The genus was erected by Francis Walker in 1856.

Species
Naroma nigrolunata Collenette, 1931 Cameroon
Naroma madecassa Griveaud, 1971 Madagascar
Naroma varipes (Walker, 1865) southern and western Africa
Naroma signifera Walker, 1856 western Africa, Congo

References

Lymantriinae